The Emperor of Portugallia (Swedish: Kejsarn av Portugallien) is a 1944 Swedish historical drama film directed by Gustaf Molander and starring Victor Sjöström, Gunn Wållgren and Karl-Arne Holmsten. It was shot at the Råsunda Studios in Stockholm and on location in the city's Old Town and the province of Värmland. The film's sets were designed by the art directors Nils Svenwall and Arne Åkermark. It is based on the 1914 novel of the same title by Selma Lagerlöf, which had previously been adapted into the 1925 American silent film The Tower of Lies.

Cast

 Victor Sjöström as 	Jan i Skrolycka
 Gunn Wållgren as 	Klara Fina Gulleborg
 Karl-Arne Holmsten as 	August där Nol
 Hilda Borgström as 	Mor i Falla
 Olof Winnerstrand as 	Agrippa Prästberg
 Holger Löwenadler as 	Lars Gunnarsson
 Märta Ekström as 	Katrin
 Marianne Löfgren as 	Jenny
 Sture Lagerwall as 	Johan Agaton Holm
 Hugo Björne as Captain of Lübeck Ship
 Carl Ström as 	Erik i Falla
 Sten Lindgren as 	Member of Parliament
 Einar Axelsson as 	Lovén
 Erland Colliander as 	Börje
 Carl-Gunnar Wingård as Bergström 
 Olof Sandborg as Swartling 
 Carl Deurell as 	Captain
 Josua Bengtson as 	Vicar 
 Gösta Bodin as 	Man at the brothel
 Eric Gustafson as Chef on the boat
 John Elfström as Farmer in the grocery store 
 Birger Åsander as 	Boy in the grocery store 
 Torsten Lilliecrona as 	Boy in the grocery store 
 Axel Högel as 	Supervisor on the boat 
 Erik Forslund as Party guest
 Anders Nyström as 	August aged 12

References

Bibliography 
 Qvist, Per Olov & von Bagh, Peter. Guide to the Cinema of Sweden and Finland. Greenwood Publishing Group, 2000.
 Steene, Birgitta. Ingmar Bergman: A Reference Guide. Amsterdam University Press, 2005.

External links 
 

1944 films
1944 drama films
1940s Swedish-language films
Films directed by Gustaf Molander
Films based on Swedish novels
Remakes of American films
Films shot in Stockholm
Films set in the 19th century
1940s historical drama films
Swedish historical drama films
Films based on works by Selma Lagerlöf
1940s Swedish films